Rostokino District is an administrative district (raion), one of the seventeen in North-Eastern Administrative Okrug of the federal city of Moscow, Russia. It is located on both banks of the Yauza River and borders with Yaroslavsky District in the northeast, Sviblovo District in the northwest, and Ostankinsky District in the south. As of the 2010 Census, the total population of the district was 37,505.

Etymology
The district takes its name from the village that stood in this area before being subsumed by Moscow, whose name in Old East Slavic literally means river split.

Municipal status
As a municipal division, it is incorporated as Rostokino Municipal Okrug.

Miscellaneous
The main landmark is the 18th-century Rostokino Aqueduct. Gorky Film Studio is located in the district.

References

Notes

Sources

Districts of Moscow
North-Eastern Administrative Okrug
